Olaijah Griffin (born March 10, 1999) is an American football cornerback who is a free agent. He played college football at USC and was signed by the Buffalo Bills as an undrafted free agent in 2021.

Professional career

Buffalo Bills 
After going unselected in the 2021 NFL Draft, Griffin was signed by the Buffalo Bills as an undrafted free agent. He was released at the final roster cuts but re-signed to the practice squad the next day, where he spent the rest of the 2021 season. He was signed to a two-year futures contract on January 24, 2022. He was waived on August 14, 2022.

New York Giants 
On August 15, 2022, Griffin was claimed off waivers by the New York Giants. He was waived on August 29. The Giants re-signed Griffin to their practice squad on September 28. He was released on November 8.

Personal life
Griffin is the son of rapper Warren G and step-nephew of rapper and producer Dr. Dre.

References

External links
USC Trojans bio

1999 births
Living people
Buffalo Bills players
New York Giants players
American football safeties
USC Trojans football players
People from Mission Viejo, California